The Mes Aynak mine is a large copper mine located in the east of Afghanistan in Logar Province. Mes Aynak represents one of the largest copper reserve in Afghanistan and in the world having estimated reserves of 690 million tonnes of ore grading 1.65% copper.

History
On 17 May 2020, the Taliban attacked a security checkpoint near the Mes Aynak mine. Eight security guards were killed and five others wounded.

References 

Copper mines in Afghanistan